Dillon Francis Casey (born October 29, 1983) is an American-born Canadian actor and producer. He is best known for his role as Sean Pierce in 
The CW action-thriller television series Nikita.

Early life
Casey was born in Dallas, Texas and raised in Oakville, Ontario. His father, Richard, is a urologist, and his mother, Patrice, is an image consultant. After graduating from Oakville Trafalgar High School, Casey graduated from McGill University with a Bachelor of Science degree in 2005, and earned a Master of Economics degree from the University of Toronto.

Career
He moved to Toronto to return to his roots and was chosen to play the role of Trevor Lemonde in a short running CBC show called MVP. The show garnered attention for the actor, putting him on a giant billboard in his underwear in Times Square.

Casey relocated to Los Angeles, California for his career in January 2009. Over the next few years he attained guest roles on shows including Warehouse 13 and The Vampire Diaries and recurring roles on Valemont, Being Erica, and Skins.

In July 2011, Casey appeared as Brad in a notable episode of Torchwood: Miracle Day, titled "Dead of Night".

In 2011, he was cast as Navy SEAL Sean Pierce in the action show Nikita. Casey's part was initially intended to be a short term recurring role, but was upgraded to a series regular.

He obtained his first lead role for the movie Creature which was released in September 2011 and was unsuccessful at the box office.

In 2012, Casey was cast in The Vow, which was successful at the box office as the fourth-highest weekend debut of 2012.

Casey starred in the 2013 digital series Backpackers, and in the 2014-15 TV drama Remedy.

In 2016, he guest starred in Marvel's Agents of S.H.I.E.L.D., appearing in the episodes 4,722 Hours and Maveth as astronaut Will Daniels and HYDRA Inhuman Hive.

Filmography

Film

Television

Awards and nominations

References

External links
 
 
 

1983 births
American male film actors
American male stage actors
American male television actors
Canadian male film actors
Canadian male stage actors
Canadian male television actors
Living people
McGill University alumni
Place of birth missing (living people)
University of Toronto alumni
21st-century Canadian male actors
21st-century American male actors
Male actors from Ontario
American emigrants to Canada
People from Oakville, Ontario